Elle Kull (born 5 January 1952 in Haapsalu) is an Estonian actress and politician. She was a member of X Riigikogu.

She has been a member of Res Publica Party.

Selected filmography
Äratus (1989)
Amber Wings (2003)
Jade Warrior (2006)
Georg (2007)
Letters to Angel (2011)

References

Living people
1952 births
Estonian film actresses
Estonian stage actresses
Estonian television actresses
20th-century Estonian actresses
21st-century Estonian actresses
Res Publica Party politicians
Members of the Riigikogu, 2003–2007
Women members of the Riigikogu
Recipients of the Order of the White Star, 4th Class
Estonian Academy of Music and Theatre alumni
People from Haapsalu
Members of the Riigikogu, 2007–2011
21st-century Estonian women politicians